

Sa 
Sabljari Bugojno, Sadovače Vitez (BiH), Sandžak Donji Vakuf, Sanski Most, Sažići Travnik,

Se 
Seoca, Seonica, 
Sebešić Novi Travnik, Sečevo Travnik, Sedlari, Seferi Travnik, Seferovići Bugojno, Seferovići Uskoplje, Selići Travnik, Selakovići Fojnica, Selište Fojnica, Selište Jajce, Selište (municipality Mostar), Seljani, Semin Donji Vakuf, Seoci Jajce, Seoci Uskoplje, Seona Novi Travnik, Servani Bugojno

Si 
Sijedac, Silajdževina Donji Vakuf, Sitišće Fojnica, Sitnik, Sivrino Selo Vitez (BiH)

Sj 
Sjekose

Sk 
Skrobućani (municipality Prozor-Rama), Skravnik, Skrte Bugojno, Skomorje Travnik, Skradno Busovača

Sl 
Slatina, Slatina, Slatina Donji Vakuf, Slavičići, Slavkovići, Slavogostići (municipality Ravno), Slimena Travnik, Slipčevići Dobretići, Slipčići (municipality Mostar), Slivnica Bobani (municipality Ravno), Slivnica Površ (municipality Ravno), Služanj

Sm 
Smajlovići Fojnica, Smionica Jajce, Smrčevice Uskoplje

So 
Sofići, Sokolina Donji Vakuf, Solakova Kula, Solakovići Busovača, Solakovići Kiseljak, Sopot, Sopotnica, Sorlaci (part), Sovići, Sovići (municipality Mostar)

Sp 
Spahovići, Sparožići (municipality Ravno), Spiljani

Sr 
Srebrenik, Sretnice (municipality Mostar)

St 
Stanojevići, Stolac (Herzegovina-Neretva Canton), Stare Kuće Jajce, Staro Selo Donji Vakuf, Stojčići Kreševo, Stojići Bugojno, Stojkovići, Stojkovići Novi Travnik, Stojkovići Kiseljak, Stojkovići, Stolac Bugojno, Strane Busovača, Strgonice, Striževo (municipality Mostar), 
Struge, Stubica Busovača, Studenčica

Su 
Suhi Dol Travnik, Suhodol Donji Vakuf, Sultanovići Donji Vakuf, Sultići, Surovi

Sv 
Svijenča Svitava, Svilići Uskoplje, Svinjarevo Kiseljak

Lists of settlements in the Federation of Bosnia and Herzegovina (A-Ž)